Jamie Loeb and Ana Sofía Sánchez were the defending champions, but both players chose not to participate.

Australian-duo Arina Rodionova and Storm Sanders won the title, defeating Dalma Gálfi and Georgina García Pérez in the final, 6–4, 6–4.

Seeds

Draw

Draw

References
Main Draw

Torneig Internacional de Tennis Femení Solgironès - Doubles